La Horgne is a commune in the Ardennes department in northern France.

History 
During the German Invasion of France there was a battle fought at La Horgne on 15 May 1940. The German 1st Rifle Regiment were advancing as part of Kampfgruppe Krüger when they came up against the French 3rd Spahis Brigade who had fortified the village. The local geography prohibited the use of tanks and artillery to support the infantry attack which failed to break through. The regimental commander, Oberstleutnant Hermann Balck, came forward to lead his men and encourage them. The village fell to the Germans by the afternoon but delayed their advance and inflicted more casualties on the regiment than any other day of the campaign.

Of his opponents, Balch recorded -

Population

See also
Communes of the Ardennes department
Battle of La Horgne (in French)

References

Communes of Ardennes (department)
Ardennes communes articles needing translation from French Wikipedia